Drummondville Water Aerodrome  is located  east of Drummondville, Quebec, Canada.

The airport is classified as an airport of entry by Nav Canada and is staffed by the Canada Border Services Agency (CBSA). CBSA officers at this airport can handle general aviation aircraft only, with no more than 15 passengers.

See also
 Drummondville Airport

References

Transport in Drummondville
Registered aerodromes in Centre-du-Québec
Seaplane bases in Quebec